Martha Wells (born September 1, 1964) is an American writer of speculative fiction. She has published a number of fantasy novels, young adult novels, media tie-ins, short stories, and nonfiction essays on fantasy and science fiction subjects. Her novels have been translated into twelve languages. Wells has won four Hugo Awards, two Nebula Awards and three Locus Awards for her science fiction series The Murderbot Diaries. She is also known for her fantasy series Ile-Rien and The Books of the Raksura. Wells is praised for the complex, realistically detailed societies she creates; this is often credited to her academic background in anthropology.

Life
Martha Wells was born in Fort Worth, Texas, and has a B.A. in Anthropology from Texas A&M University. She lives in College Station, Texas, with her husband. She was involved in SF/F fandom in college and was chairman of AggieCon 17.

Career
As an aspiring writer Wells attended many local writing workshops and conventions, including the Turkey City Writer's Workshop taught by Bruce Sterling. She has also taught writing workshops at ArmadilloCon, WorldCon, ApolloCon, and Writespace Houston, and was the Special Workshop Guest at FenCon in 2018.

Her first published novel, The Element of Fire (1993), was a finalist for that year's Compton Crook Award, and a runner-up for the 1994 William Crawford Award. Her second novel, City of Bones (1995), received a starred review from Publishers Weekly and a black diamond review from Kirkus Reviews, and was on the 1995 Locus Recommended Reading List for fantasy. Her third novel, The Death of the Necromancer (1998), was nominated for a Nebula Award. The Element of Fire and The Death of the Necromancer are stand-alone novels which take place in the country of Ile-Rien, which is also the setting for the Fall of Ile-Rien trilogy: The Wizard Hunters (2003), The Ships of Air (2004), and The Gate of Gods (2005). Her fourth novel was a stand-alone fantasy, Wheel of the Infinite. In 2006, she released a revised edition of The Element of Fire.

She has written media tie-ins, including Reliquary and Entanglement set in the Stargate Atlantis universe, "Archaeology 101", a short story based on Stargate SG-1 for issue No. 8 (Jan/Feb 2006) of the official Stargate Magazine, and a Star Wars novel, Empire and Rebellion: Razor's Edge.

Her fantasy short stories include "The Potter's Daughter" in the anthology Elemental (2006), which was selected to appear in The Year's Best Fantasy #7 (2007). This story features one of the main characters from The Element of Fire. Three prequel short stories to the Fall of Ile-Rien trilogy were published in Black Gate Magazine in 2007 and 2008.

Wells' longest-running fantasy series is The Books of the Raksura, which included five novels and two short fiction collections published by Night Shade Books: The Cloud Roads (2011), The Serpent Sea (2012), The Siren Depths (2012), Stories of the Raksura Vol 1: The Falling World & The Tale of Indigo and Cloud (2014), Stories of the Raksura Vol 2: The Dead City & The Dark Earth Below (2015), The Edge of Worlds (2016), and The Harbors of the Sun (2017). The series was nominated for the Hugo Award for Best Series in 2018, and The Edge of Worlds was reviewed in The New York Times.

Wells has written two young adult fantasy novels, Emilie and the Hollow World and Emilie and the Sky World, published by Angry Robot/Strange Chemistry in 2013 and 2014.

Wells was toastmaster of the World Fantasy Convention in 2017, where she delivered a speech called "Unbury the Future" about marginalized creators in the history of science fiction and fantasy, movies, and other media, and the deliberate suppression of the existence of those creators. The speech was well-received and generated a great deal of discussion.

During 2018, Wells was the leader of the story team and lead writer for the new Dominaria expansion of the card game Magic: The Gathering.

In May 2018, her Murderbot Diaries novella All Systems Red was number 8 on The New York Times Bestseller List for Audio. The book won the 2017 Nebula Award for Best Novella, the 2018 Hugo Award for Best Novella, the 2018 Locus Award for Best Novella, and the American Library Association's Alex Award, and was nominated for the 2017 Philip K. Dick Award. It was followed by the sequel novellas Artificial Condition (2018), Rogue Protocol (2018), and Exit Strategy (2018); a short story, "Compulsory" (2018); and a full novel sequel, Network Effect (2020), which made The New York Times Bestseller List for Novel. On April 26, 2021, Tor.com publishing announced that they had signed a deal with Wells for six books, including three more Murderbot Diaries.

In September 2022, Tor Book shared the cover of Witch King, a new novel by Wells that will be released on May 30, 2023. Tor describes the book as a story "of power and friendship, of trust and betrayal, and of the families we choose."

Awards and nominations

 Nomination for Journal d’un AssaSynth, tomes 1 à 4 (translated by Mathilde Montier) in the 2020 Grand Prix de l'Imaginaire awards in the Nouvelle étrangère category
 Nominations for Tagebuch eines Killerbots (The Murderbot Diaries Omnibus) for Best Foreign Novel published in German and for translator Frank Böhmert for Best Translation in the 2020 Kurd Laßwitz Preis
 Finalist for The Murderbot Diaries, Books 1–4 (translated by Naoya Nakahara) in the Seiun Award in the Best Translated Novel category
 Winner for Sistemas críticos (translated by Carla Bataller Estruch) in the Ignotus Award in the Best Foreign Short Story category
 Winner for Journal d’un AssaSynth, tomes 1 à 4 (translated by Mathilde Montier) in the 2020 Prix Bob Morane in the Romans étrangers category
 Locus Recommended List in 1994 for The Element of Fire
 Locus Recommended List in 1995 for City of Bones
 Martha Wells declined a Nebula finalist slot in the Best Novella category for Fugitive Telemetry in the 2021 Nebula Awards, giving the reason that The Murderbot Diaries had already won two Nebulas (for Best Novella and Best Novel) and that the spot would be of more benefit to another writer. Due to a three-way tie for sixth place, declining allowed two additional novellas a spot on the 2021 ballot.
 Network Effect (translated by Frank Böhmert) was a finalist for the Kurd Laßwitz Preis 2022 for Best SF in German translation.
 Finalist for Network Effect (translated by Naoya Nakahara) for the Seiun Award in the international longform category
 On October 19, 2022, she was made a member of the Texas Literary Hall of Fame

Published works

Stand-alone fantasy novels
 City of Bones (1995)
 Wheel of the Infinite (2000)
 Witch King (2023)

Ile-Rien
Listed in order of the internal chronology, not by year of publication.
 "The Potter's Daughter" (2006 short story, Elemental: the Tsunami Relief Anthology , The Year's Best Fantasy #7 )
 The Element of Fire (1993, ; revised edition 2006)
 "Night at the Opera" (2015, in the collection Between Worlds: the Collected Cineth and Ile-Rien Stories and PodCastle Episode 400)
 The Death of the Necromancer (1998)
 The Fall of Ile-Rien trilogy:
 The Wizard Hunters (2003)
 The Ships of Air (2004)
 The Gate of Gods (2005)

Books of the Raksura
 The Cloud Roads (2011)
 The Serpent Sea (2012)
 The Siren Depths (2012)
 Stories of the Raksura Vol 1: The Falling World & The Tale of Indigo and Cloud  (2014)
 Stories of the Raksura Vol 2: The Dead City & The Dark Earth Below (2015)
 The Edge of Worlds (2016)
 The Harbors of the Sun (2017)
Short stories
 "The Forest Boy" (2009) – prequel to The Cloud Roads. In the collection Stories of the Raksura Vol 1.
 "The Almost Last Voyage of the Wind-ship Escarpment" (2011) – set in the same world. In the collection Stories of the Raksura Vol 2.
 "Adaptation" (2012) – prequel to The Cloud Roads. In the collection Stories of the Raksura Vol 1.
 "Mimesis" (2013) – in the anthology The Other Half of the Sky (2013)
 "Trading Lesson" (2013) – in the collection Stories of the Raksura Vol 1
 "Birthright" (2017) – in the anthology Mech: Age of Steel (2013)

Emilie
Young-adult fantasy
 Emilie and the Hollow World (2013)
 Emilie and the Sky World (2014)

Star Wars
 Empire and Rebellion: Razor's Edge  (2013)

Stargate universe

 Reliquary (2006 Stargate Atlantis novel)
 Entanglement (2007 Stargate Atlantis novel)
 "Archaeology 101" (2006 Stargate SG-1 short story, Stargate Magazine)

The Murderbot Diaries
Science fiction series:

 All Systems Red (2017 Tor.com novella)
 Artificial Condition (2018 Tor.com novella)
 Rogue Protocol (2018 Tor.com novella)
 Exit Strategy (2018 Tor.com novella)
 "Compulsory" (2018 Wired short story)
 "Home: Habitat, Range, Niche, Territory" (2020 Tor.com short story)
 Network Effect (2020 Tor.com novel)
 Fugitive Telemetry (2021 Tor.com novella)
 System Collapse (upcoming novel publishing in 2023)

Other short stories
 "Thorns" (1995, Realms of Fantasy)
 "Bad Medicine" (1997, Realms of Fantasy)
 "Wolf Night" (2006, Lone Star Stories)
 "Reflections" (2007, Black Gate Magazine)
 "Holy Places" (2007, Black Gate Magazine)
 "Houses of the Dead" (2008, Black Gate Magazine)
 "Revenants" (2012, in the anthology Tales of the Emerald Serpent)
 "Soul of Fire" (2014, in the anthology Tales of the Emerald Serpent II: A Knight in the Silk Purse)
 "The Dark Gates" (2015, in the anthology The Gods of Lovecraft)
 "The Salt Witch" (2020, Uncanny Magazine)

Non-fiction
 "Don't Make Me Tongue You: John Crichton and D'Argo and the Dysfunctional Buddy Relationship" (2005, Farscape Forever)
 "Neville Longbottom: the Hero with a Thousand Faces" (2006, Mapping the World of Harry Potter)
 "Donna Noble Saves the Universe" (2012, Chicks Unravel Time: Women Journey Through Every Season of Doctor Who)
 "A Life Less Ordinary: The Environment, Magic Systems, and Non-Humans" (2014, A Kobold Guide to Magic)
 "The Ups and Downs of a Long Career" (2019, The Writer's Book of Doubt)

Notes

References

External links
 
 Blog
 
 Martha Wells at FantasyLiterature.com – novels synopses, cover art, and reviews
 Martha Wells at IdRef – bibliographic data for French-language editions
 

1964 births
Living people
20th-century American novelists
21st-century American novelists
American fantasy writers
American science fiction writers
American women short story writers
American women novelists
People from Fort Worth, Texas
Novelists from Texas
Women science fiction and fantasy writers
20th-century American women writers
21st-century American women writers
20th-century American short story writers
21st-century American short story writers
Nebula Award winners
Hugo Award-winning writers